Jeunesse Sportive de Kabylie, an Algerian professional association football club, has gained entry to Confederation of African Football (CAF) competitions on several occasions. They have represented Algeria in the Champions League on sixteen occasions, the Confederation Cup on five occasions, the now-defunct Cup Winners' Cup two occasions, and the now-defunct CAF Cup four occasions.

Overview
JS Kabylie is the most successful Algerian club at both the domestic level and the international level. At the domestic level, the club has won Algerian league 14 times and the Algerian Cup 5 times. At the continental level, the club has won the CAF Champions League twice, in 1981 and 1990, the African Cup Winners' Cup once in 1995, and the CAF Cup three times in 2000, 2001 and 2002.

CAF competitions

Statistics by country
Statistics correct as of game against Espérance de Tunis on February 1, 2020

CAF competitions

Non-CAF competitions

Statistics

By season
Information correct as of 1 February 2020.
Key

Pld = Played
W = Games won
D = Games drawn
L = Games lost
F = Goals for
A = Goals against
Grp = Group stage

PR = Preliminary round
R1 = First round
R2 = Second round
PO = Play-off round
R16 = Round of 16
QF = Quarter-final
SF = Semi-final

Key to colours and symbols:

By competition

In Africa
:

Non-CAF competitions

Finals
Matches won after regular time (90 minutes of play), extra-time (aet) or a penalty shootout (p) are highlighted in green, while losses are highlighted in red.

African competitions goals
Statistics correct as of game against US GN on January 5, 2021

Hat-tricks

Two goals one match

African and arab opponents by cities

Notes

References

JS Kabylie
JS Kabylie